Mala Sela is a small settlement west of Vače in the Municipality of Litija in central Slovenia. The area is part of the traditional region of Upper Carniola. It is now included with the rest of the municipality in the Central Sava Statistical Region.

Name
There were formerly two neighboring villages: Sela and Mala Sela (literally, 'village' and 'little village'). Mala Sela was annexed by Sela in 1953, and then in 1955 the name of the consolidated settlement was changed from Sela to Mala sela.

References

External links
Mala Sela on Geopedia

Populated places in the Municipality of Litija